Twenty is the ninth studio album by American rock band Lynyrd Skynyrd, released in 1997. The title of the album refers to the fact that it had been twenty years since the plane crash which killed original lead singer Ronnie Van Zant, guitarist Steve Gaines, and backup singer Cassie Gaines.

For this album the band brought in two Southern rock veterans, Rickey Medlocke, who had been a drummer for the band briefly before forming Blackfoot, and Hughie Thomasson of the Outlaws. The track "Travelin' Man" is the first studio recording of the song from the original band's 1976 live album One More from the Road. Making use of modern technology, the band was able to use original singer Ronnie Van Zant's vocal tracks on parts of the song, in order to create a duet between Johnny and Ronnie. The Album Cover is a fictional drawing of Monument Valley on the Navajo reservation.

Track listing
 "We Ain't Much Different" (Mike Estes, Rickey Medlocke, Gary Rossington, Hughie Thomasson, Johnny Van Zant) – 3:44
 "Bring It On" (Medlocke, Rossington, Thomasson, J. Van Zant) – 4:56
 "Voodoo Lake" (Bob Britt, Chris Eddy, J. Van Zant) – 4:37
 "Home Is Where the Heart Is" (Medlocke, Rossington, Thomasson, J. Van Zant) – 5:26
 "Travelin' Man" (Ronnie Van Zant, Leon Wilkeson) – 4:05
 "Talked Myself Right Into It" (Pat Buchanan, Donnie Van Zant, J. Van Zant, Robert White Johnson) – 3:25
 "Never Too Late" (Medlocke, Rossington, Thomasson, J. Van Zant) – 5:18
 "O.R.R." (Medlocke, Rossington, Thomasson, J. Van Zant) – 4:16
 "Blame It on a Sad Song" (Medlocke, Rossington, Thomasson, J. Van Zant) – 5:35
 "Berneice" (Medlocke, Rossington, Dennis E. Sumner, Thomasson, J. Van Zant) – 4:01
 "None of Us Are Free" (Barry Mann, Brenda Russell, Cynthia Weil) – 5:23
 "How Soon We Forget" (Buchanan, D. Van Zant, J. Van Zant, White Johnson) – 4:50
 "Sign of the Times" (Japan bonus track) - 3:44

Personnel 
Lynyrd Skynyrd
Gary Rossington – lead, rhythm, slide and acoustic guitars
Johnny Van Zant – lead vocals, harmonica
Leon Wilkeson – bass
Ricky Medlocke – lead, rhythm, slide, acoustic and Dobro guitars; background vocals; harmonica
Hughie Thomasson – lead, rhythm, slide and acoustic guitars; background vocals
Billy Powell – piano and Hammond B-3 organ
Owen Hale – drums and percussion

Additional personnel
Ronnie Van Zant – vocals on "Travelin' Man"

Chart positions

References

Lynyrd Skynyrd albums
1997 albums
Albums produced by Josh Leo
CMC International albums